Brian Liesegang (born  February 10, 1970) is an American songwriter, producer, composer, guitarist and programmer, and a founding member of the industrial rock band Filter.

Biography
Liesegang was born in New York City, where his father Dr. Thomas Liesegang was attending medical school. He has since lived everywhere from North and South Carolina, to Jacksonville (graduating from The Bolles School), Miami, and Gainesville, Florida, to New Orleans, Los Angeles, Houston, Cleveland, spending most of his formative years in Rochester, Minnesota. He later moved to Chicago, Illinois, where he received an honors degree in philosophy from the University of Chicago.  He was very involved in the music, and skateboarding scene as a youth.  Joining the band Nine Inch Nails upon graduation from college,  Brian lived with Trent Reznor in New Orleans for a while, working on the Grammy Award-winning Broken before the band relocated to Los Angeles, or more specifically, the Sharon Tate house to record The Downward Spiral.

After leaving Nine Inch Nails, Brian was the producer, guitarist and founding member of the Industrial rock band Filter along with Richard Patrick. Filter was formed in 1993 in Cleveland Ohio. The album Short Bus was released on April 25, 1995 and it sold over one million copies and features Brian's work with the band. It was recorded "in a small brick house somewhere in Chicago". It is best known for the hit single "Hey Man Nice Shot", reputedly about Budd Dwyer's public suicide; but the duo had hits on many soundtracks, working with The Crystal Method and The Dust Brothers.  They embarked on an exhaustive world tour, as headliners,  and opening for the likes of the Smashing Pumpkins, Ozzy Osbourne, White Zombie and more....  The duo was also nominated for "Best New Band" at the MTV music awards. Brian has been mentioned on each Filter CD released since then in the liner notes, but he actually left the band during the summer of 1997.  He and Richard Patrick have remained friends, and Brian contributed some production work and guitar/keyboard parts to the latest Filter record, The Trouble with Angels as well as "Fades Like a Photograph" from the movie "2012".

Since leaving Filter, Brian produced, wrote, and played on Veruca Salt's Resolver record, and started planting the seeds of the band Ashtar Command with Chris Holmes, writing songs for Sinead O'Connor and more...  Also during this time, Brian worked on Billy Corgan's solo album. The record being mostly electronic in nature, he worked closely with Billy, Bon Harris (Nitzer Ebb), and Matt Walker (original Filter drummer, Smashing Pumpkins, and Morrissey). The live band was nicknamed "The Fellowship of Broken Toys".  They finished touring for Corgan's album TheFutureEmbrace in August 2005.

Liesegang is currently spending all his time as the co-founder of Ashtar Command with writing and producer partner Chris Holmes. The music of Brian and Ashtar Command has been featured in many places,  from Nissan car commercial, Microsoft campaigns, The O.C., Ugly Betty, Grey's Anatomy, The Avengers movie soundtrack, Rockstar Games' Red Dead Redemption (for which they were nominated for video game song of the year),  The Sims, Capcom's Dead Rising, FIFA 2014, and many more. He has recently been working with Disney on their new interactive "Fantasia:Music Evolved",  contributed the closing track to the latest Percy Jackson film, and has been working with Chris Holmes as Sir Paul McCartney's official remixers. 

Brian had double knee replacement surgery in 2019 and after recovering from surgery moved to the United Kingdom.

References 

1970 births
Living people
American rock guitarists
American male guitarists
Filter (band) members
Bolles School alumni
21st-century American guitarists
21st-century American male musicians